St. Felix (population: 250) is a rural municipality in Prince Edward Island, Canada.

The Tignish River (also known as Harper's Brook) begins in the community and runs to Deblois.

The community's name is derived from Pope Felix I.

Communities 
 Tignish
 Greenmount
 Tignish Shore
 Central Kildare
 St. Roch

Demographics 

References 

Communities in Prince County, Prince Edward Island
Rural municipalities in Prince Edward Island